The mixed doubles tournament at the 1982 French Open was held from 24 May until 6 June 1982 on the outdoor clay courts at the Stade Roland Garros in Paris, France. John Lloyd and Wendy Turnbull won the title, defeating Cássio Motta and Cláudia Monteiro in the final.

Seeds

Draw

Finals

Top half

Bottom half

External links
1982 French Open – Doubles draws and results at the International Tennis Federation

Mixed Doubles
French Open by year – Mixed doubles